The Cruelty to Animals Act 1849 is an Act of the Parliament of the United Kingdom (12 & 13 Vict. c. 92) with the long title An Act for the more effectual Prevention of Cruelty to Animals.

The Act repealed two previous Acts, the Cruel Treatment of Cattle Act 1822 and the Cruelty to Animals Act 1835, and reiterated the offences of beating, ill-treating, over-driving, abusing and torturing animals with a maximum penalty of £5 and compensation of up to £10.
The Act was amended and including a prison sentence for the unlawful killing of any animals covers within the law and expanded by the Cruelty to Animals Act 1876, and repealed by the Protection of Animals Act 1911.

See also
Animals (Scientific Procedures) Act 1986
Wild Animals in Captivity Protection Act 1900
Animal welfare in the United Kingdom

References
 The text of the Act
 The British Almanac of the Society for the Diffusion of Useful Knowledge, 1850, p. 142.

1849 in British law
United Kingdom Acts of Parliament 1849
Cruelty to animals
Animal welfare and rights legislation in the United Kingdom
Animal testing in the United Kingdom